"Easy" is a song by Dominican-American singer DaniLeigh. It was later remixed with vocals from American R&B singer Chris Brown, and it was released on May 31, 2019, under Def Jam Recordings as a single.

Composition
"Easy" is an R&B slow-jam produced by Fallon King and Christopher Allen Clark, where the singers perform a mutual serenade dedicated to the intimate moments of two people in love.

Charts

Weekly charts

Year-end charts

Certifications

References

2019 singles
2019 songs
Chris Brown songs
Songs written by Chris Brown